Cownie is a surname. Notable people with the surname include:

Frank Cownie (born 1948), American politician and businessman
Peter Cownie (born 1980), American politician
Ryan Cownie (born 1987/88), American stand-up comedian

See also
Connie

English-language surnames